Orbec is a commune in the Calvados department in the Normandy region in northwestern France.

Population

International relations
Orbec is twinned with:
Kingsteignton UK since 1979
Frammersbach (Germany) since 1987

See also
Communes of the Calvados department

References

External links

Official site

Communes of Calvados (department)
Calvados communes articles needing translation from French Wikipedia